Picton Clock Tower is a 19th-century Grade II listed clock tower located in Wavertree, Liverpool, England. Built in 1884 and designed by James Picton, the tower is a memorial to the architect's wife Sarah Pooley, who had died in 1879.

Architecture
Renaissance in its style, the tower consists of three sections mounted upon a rusticated base and surrounded on four sides by iron street lamps which feature dolphins at their base. On the lower section walls, there are three stone plaques on each side and an access door to the tower, above these are roundels with urns at each corners. Above these are round-headed windows which are topped with a clock face in each direction. At the very top of the tower is a spire with lead cupola.

Plaques
The tower has plaques on three of its sides with two being poems and one a dedication to James Picton's wife Sarah Pooley.

See also
Grade II listed buildings in Liverpool-L15

References

Grade II listed buildings in Liverpool
Clock towers in the United Kingdom
Towers completed in 1884
Individual clocks in England